Murder in the Music Hall is a 1946 American musical mystery film directed by John English and starring Vera Ralston, William Marshall and Helen Walker. The film involves a murder in Radio City Music Hall with The Rockettes as suspects.

The film's sets were designed by the art director Russell Kimball. It was re-released in 1951.

Plot
Lila Laughton is a Rockette figure skater at Radio City Music Hall in New York. She's dating orchestra conductor Don Jordan. Her ex-flame, producer Carl Lang, gets out of jail and visits her. Lang plays a song he wrote just for Lila, and demands that she appear in his new show or he'll tell the world that she poisoned her ex-lover Douglas five years ago. Frightened, Lila tells fellow performers Diane and Millicent and understudy Gracie about Lang's return. They sympathize, as all of them worked for him before.

When Lila and Don return to Lang's apartment to retrieve Lila's purse, they find him dead and a woman's glove on the floor. Lila and Don show the glove to the other girls, and Diane (who also dated Douglas) accuses Lila of murder. It turns out the glove belongs to Rita Morgan, wife of a local newspaper columnist. Don tells Rita that he has her glove, and she meets with Don and Lila. Rita, it turns out, is a former chorus girl who also worked for Carl and was being blackmailed by him.

Rita says a blind man named Mr. Winters can exonerate her. Don and Lila find Winter, but quickly discover he's an imposter. The real Winters says he was paid by a man, revealed to be Rita's husband George, to stay away from the apartment. George admits he entered the apartment disguised as Winters to steal the incriminating letters Lang had, but cannot identify the woman he saw running out.

Detective Wilson, who has been investigating the case, tells everyone to meet at the music hall. Lila overhears someone humming the song Carl Lang had composed, and realizes only the murderer would know the tune. Gracie is exposed as the killer: She was hiding in Lang's apartment when Lang and Lila arrived. She killed Lang in a jealous rage when she overheard him saying he loved Lila.

Cast
Vera Ralston as Lila Laughton (as Vera Hruba Ralston)
William Marshall as Don Jordan
Helen Walker as Millicent
Nancy Kelly as Mrs. Rita Morgan
William Gargan as Inspector Wilson
Ann Rutherford as Gracie
Julie Bishop as Diane
Jerome Cowan as George Morgan
Edward Norris as Carl Lang
Paul Hurst as Hobarth
Frank Orth as Henderson, the Stage Manager
Jack La Rue as Bruce Wilton
James Craven as Mr. Winters

References

Bibliography
 McCarty, Clifford. Film Composers in America: A Filmography, 1911-1970. Oxford University Press, 2000.

External links 
 

1946 films
Films directed by John English
1946 musical films
Radio City Music Hall
Republic Pictures films
1946 mystery films
American mystery films
American black-and-white films
American musical films
Films set in Manhattan
1940s English-language films
1940s American films